The  was the upper house of the Imperial Diet as mandated under the Constitution of the Empire of Japan (in effect from 11 February 1889 to 3 May 1947).

Background

In 1869, under the new Meiji government, a Japanese peerage was created by an Imperial decree merging the former court nobility (kuge) and former feudal lords (daimyos) into a single new aristocratic class called the kazoku. A second imperial ordinance in 1884 grouped the kazoku into five ranks equivalent to the European aristocrats: prince (or duke), marquis, count, viscount, and baron. Although this grouping idea was taken from the European peerage, the Japanese titles were taken from Chinese and based on the ancient feudal system in China. Itō Hirobumi and the other Meiji leaders deliberately modeled the chamber on the British House of Lords, as a counterweight to the popularly elected House of Representatives (Shūgiin).

Establishment

In 1889, the House of Peers Ordinance established the House of Peers and its composition. For the first session of the Imperial Diet (November 1890–March 1891), there were 145 hereditary members and 106 imperial appointees and high taxpayers, for a total of 251 members. In the 1920s, four new peers elected by the Japan Imperial Academy were added, and the number of peers elected by the top taxpayers of each prefecture was increased from 47 to 66 as some prefectures now elected two members. Inversely, the minimum age for hereditary (dukes and marquesses) and mutually elected (counts, viscounts and barons) noble peers was increased to 30, slightly reducing their number. By 1938, membership reached 409 seats. After the addition of seats for the imperial colonies of Chōsen (the Japanese colonial name of Korea) and Taiwan during the last stages of WWII, it stood at 418 at the beginning of the 89th Imperial Diet in November 1945, briefly before Douglas MacArthur's "purge" barred many members from public office. In 1947 during its 92nd and final session, the number of members was 373.

Composition

After revisions to the Ordinance, notably in 1925, the House of Peers comprised:

 The crown prince and the imperial grandson and heir presumptive from the age of 18, with the term of office for life.
 All imperial princes and lesser princes of the imperial blood over the age of 20, with the term of office for life.
 All princes and marquises over the age of 25 (raised to 30 in 1925), with the term of office for life.
 18 counts, 66 viscounts and 66 barons over the age of 25 (raised to 30 in 1925), for seven-year terms.
 125 distinguished politicians and scientists over the age of 30 nominated by the Emperor in consultation with the Privy Council, with the term of office for life.
 4 members of the Imperial Academy over the age of 30, elected by the academicians and nominated by the Emperor, for seven-year terms.
 66 elected representatives of the 6000 highest taxpayers, over the age of 30 and for seven-year terms.

Postwar dissolution

After World War II, the United States occupied Japan and undertook widespread structural changes to progress the principles of what it felt were democratization and demilitarization, which included extensive land reform that stripped the nobility of their land and therefore a major source of income. A new constitution was also written by the occupants, the current Constitution of Japan, in effect from 3 May 1947, which required the mostly unelected House of Peers be replaced by an elected House of Councillors.

Leadership

Presidents

Vice presidents

See also
 Westminster System
 Prussian House of Lords
 House of Ariki 
 Chamber of Peers
 Chamber of Fasces and Corporations
 Reichstag (Nazi Germany)
 Gentry assembly
 Assembly of Notables
 The Seanad
 Tricameral Parliament

References

Government of Japan
Politics of the Empire of Japan
Defunct upper houses
1889 establishments in Japan
1947 disestablishments in Japan